Comber railway station was on the Belfast and County Down Railway which ran from Belfast to Newcastle, County Down in Northern Ireland.

History

The station was opened by the Belfast and County Down Railway on 6 May 1850 as the penultimate station on the original single-track line to Newtownards.
With the opening of the branch to Ballygowan and Downpatrick in 1958, it became a junction. The Newtownards branch was eventually extended to Donaghadee and the Downpatrick line to Newcastle.

The station closed to passengers in 1950, by which time it had been taken over by the Ulster Transport Authority. The station buildings, with the exception of the goods shed, were demolished and a section of the trackbed running through the station relaid as the A22 bypass.

References 

 
 
 

Disused railway stations in County Down
Railway stations opened in 1850
Railway stations closed in 1950
1850 establishments in Ireland
1950 disestablishments in Northern Ireland
Comber

Railway stations in Northern Ireland opened in 1850